Doydirhynchus is a genus of beetles belonging to the family Nemonychidae.

The species of this genus are found in Europe.

Species:
 Doydirhynchus austriacus (Olivier, 1807) 
 Doydirhynchus bicolor Kuschel, 1993

References

Nemonychidae
Beetle genera